Artem Anatolyevich Chernousov (born 10 January 1996) is a Russian sport shooter.

He participated at the 2018 ISSF World Shooting Championships.

References

External links

1996 births
Russian male sport shooters
Living people
ISSF pistol shooters
European Games gold medalists for Russia
Shooters at the 2019 European Games
European Games medalists in shooting
Olympic shooters of Russia
Shooters at the 2020 Summer Olympics
Medalists at the 2020 Summer Olympics
Olympic silver medalists for the Russian Olympic Committee athletes
Olympic medalists in shooting
Sportspeople from Irkutsk